The Americas Zone is one of the three zones of regional Davis Cup competition in 2012.

In the Americas Zone there are three different groups in which teams compete against each other to advance to the next group.

Participating nations

Seeds:

Remaining nations:

Draw

 relegated to Group II in 2013.
 and  advance to World Group Play-off.

First round

Peru vs. Uruguay

Ecuador vs. Colombia

Second round

Uruguay vs. Chile

Colombia vs. Brazil

Second round play-offs

Peru vs. Ecuador

References

External links
Official website

Americas Zone Group I
Davis Cup Americas Zone